The 1953 Michigan State Normal Hurons football team represented Michigan State Normal College (renamed Eastern Michigan College in 1956 and Eastern Michigan University in 1959) in the Interstate Intercollegiate Athletic Conference (IIAC) during the 1953 college football season. In their second season under head coach Fred Trosko, the Hurons compiled a 7–1–1 record (4–1–1 against IIAC opponents) and outscored their opponents, 212 to 105. Robert L. Boyd was the team captain. The team's statistical leaders included Bob Middlekauff with 675 yards of total offense, Tom Fagan with 388 rushing yards, and Nick Manych with seven touchdowns and 42 points. Boyd also received the team's most valuable player award.

Schedule

References

Michigan State Normal
Eastern Michigan Eagles football seasons
Michigan State Normal Hurons football